Bukovskyite (also known as "clay of Kutná Hora") is an iron arsenate sulfate mineral with formula: Fe2(AsO4)(SO4)(OH)·7H2O which forms nodules with a reniform (kidney-shaped) surface. Under a microscope, these nodules appear as a collection of minute needles similar to gypsum. Some can be seen with the naked eye and occur inside the nodules.

Bukovskyite was first described from pit heaps from the Middle Ages, where sulfate ores had been mined at Kank, north of Kutná Hora in Bohemia, Czech Republic, and other old deposits in the vicinity. Only recently defined and acknowledged, it was approved by the IMA in 1969.

Bukovskyite was collected a long time ago from the overgrown pit heaps by the inhabitants of Kutná Hora. It was used for poisoning fieldmice and other field vermin. This poisonous clay, known also by the place name as "clay of Kutná Hora"', was widely known and it was considered to be 'arsenic' (arsenic trioxide). In 1901 Antonín Bukovský (1865–1950), a Czech chemist, who studied minerals of old pit heaps, proved it was an arsenate.

References

 Mineralienatlas
 Mindat with location data
 Webmineral

External links

Iron(III) minerals
Arsenate minerals
Sulfate minerals
Triclinic minerals